Portadown Railway Station serves the town of Portadown in County Armagh, Northern Ireland.

The station is located on the Belfast-Dublin railway line. The original station opened in 1842, and the present station opened in 1970.

History

The original Portadown station was sited half a mile east of the present station and opened on 12 September 1842, replacing a temporary station at Seagoe that had opened the preceding year. The Portadown station was moved to the present location in 1848 then reverted to its original site between 1863 and 1970. Goods traffic ceased on 4 January 1965. The present station opened in 1970, replacing a large and largely redundant station.

At the time (1970) the station was called Portadown - Craigavon West, a title that was quietly dropped after the "new city" Craigavon failed to materialise. The layout of the 1970 station was modified in 1997 to allow bi-directional working on all three platforms. The lines to Cavan via Armagh (closed 1957), and Derry via Dungannon and Omagh (closed 1965) diverged immediately west of the present station.

In 2012, work began on a major refurbishment of the station. A new, modern building was constructed and a footbridge replaced the subway. The refurbishment was completed in 2013.

Lay-out
The station has three platforms. After the station upgrade being completed in late May 2013 both platforms 1, 2 and 3 have lifts and have disability access. Platform 3 is usually used for storage of a train but one departs from this platform occasionally towards Great Victoria Street.

Service
This is the terminus for most services from Bangor or Belfast but there are 4 services which continue to  Mondays to Saturdays only. On Sundays there is an hourly service to Bangor and no NIR services at all to Newry, although five Enterprise services still operate between these two stations.

The line is also used by rail passengers changing at Dublin Connolly onto the DART to Dún Laoghaire for example or travelling to Dublin Port for the Irish Ferries or Stena Line to Holyhead, and then by train along the North Wales Coast Line to London Euston and other destinations in England and Wales.

Future link to Armagh City
There is a possibility of re-opening of the line from Portadown to Armagh railway station. Government Minister for the Department for Regional Development, Danny Kennedy MLA indicates railway restoration plans.

The Armagh railway line has been listed in proposed plans to reopen the line.

Bus connections
Ulsterbus services operating from Portadown railway station:
 47-Portadown-Lurgan
 63-Newry-Portadown
 75-Dungannon-Portadown
 75A-Dungannon-Craigavon
 61-Armagh-Portadown

References

External links
 Photo of a train and platform at the station

Railway stations in County Armagh
Railway stations served by NI Railways
Railway stations served by Enterprise
1842 establishments in Ireland
Railway stations in Northern Ireland opened in 1842